Dracaena elliptica is a species of Asian tropical forest under-storey plants in the family Asparagaceae; no subspecies are listed in the Catalogue of Life.

Distribution and Description 
The native range of this species is: Andaman Islands, Assam, Bangladesh, through southern China, Indo-China and western Malesia. In Vietnam the plant may be called phát dủ bầu dục (or phất dủ mảnh as D. gracilis).

References

External links 
 

elliptica
Flora of Indo-China
Flora of Malesia